The Picoña Castle is a Portuguese medieval fortification now situated in the Spanish municipality of Calvos de Randín, Ourense, Galicia. The castle, now in ruins, dates back to the early period of Portuguese independence (12th century) and was constructed over a previous Callaeci fort. In 1650 it was destroyed by Castilian troops during the Portuguese war of Restoration.

Even though the castle was the head of the Terras da Piconha, this jurisdiction was suppressed in 1866 with the transfer of the land to the Kingdom of Spain. The castle, part of the domains of the House of Braganza also guaranteed the privileges of the Couto Misto, an independent state formed by the villages of Santiago, Meaus and Rubiás.

See also
Couto Misto

References 

Castles in Galicia (Spain)